Ferencvárosi Torna Club Jégkorong Szakosztály is a Hungarian ice hockey team that currently plays in the OB I bajnokság and in the Erste Liga. They play their home games at Tüskecsarnok, located in Budapest.
In 1950–1951 the club was named ÉDOSZ Budapest and from 1951 to 1957 it was named Budapesti Kinizsi.

The team is part of the Ferencvárosi Torna Club sports organization.

Achievements 

OB I bajnokság:
 (30) : 1951, 1955, 1956, 1961, 1962, 1964, 1967, 1971, 1972, 1973, 1974, 1975, 1976, 1977, 1978, 1979, 1980, 1984, 1989, 1991, 1992, 1993, 1994, 1995, 1997, 2019, 2020, 2021, 2022, 2023
Hungarian Cup (Ice Hockey):
Winners (15) : 1968, 1969, 1973, 1974, 1975, 1976, 1977, 1979, 1980, 1983, 1990, 1991, 1992, 1995, 2020
Panonian League:
 (1) : 2003
Erste Liga:
Winners (2) : 2019, 2020

Current roster
Current roster (as of September 24, 2020):

See also
Ferencvárosi TC (football team)

External links
 Official Club Website

ice hockey
Ice hockey teams in Hungary
Panonian League teams
Erste Liga (ice hockey) teams
Interliga (1999–2007) teams
Carpathian League teams
Sport in Budapest